Vegar Barlie (born August 7, 1972) is a Norwegian ice hockey player. Barlie competed with the Norway men's national ice hockey team in the 1994 Men's World Ice Hockey Championships and in the 1994 Winter Olympics.

He was selected by the Edmonton Oilers in the 10th round (210th overall) of the  1991 NHL Entry Draft.

References

External links

1972 births
Living people
Edmonton Oilers draft picks
Ice hockey players at the 1994 Winter Olympics
Norwegian ice hockey forwards
Olympic ice hockey players of Norway
People from Asker
Frisk Asker Ishockey players
Lillehammer IK players
Vålerenga Ishockey players
Sportspeople from Viken (county)